The Married Couple of the Year Two is a 1971 French comedy film directed by Jean-Paul Rappeneau. It was entered into the 1971 Cannes Film Festival.
The title is a reference to “The Soldiers of Year II”, the conscripts raised by the Levée en masse in 1793 to defend the French First Republic against foreign invaders.

Plot
Having killed a noble too friendly with his wife Charlotte, Nicolas Phillibert flees from France to South Carolina, where he does well and wants to marry a rich man's daughter. To do so, he will first have to return to France and get a divorce. On landing at Nantes in 1793, the Reign of Terror is raging and he is arrested by the authorities. Taken to a republican ceremony in the cathedral, he saves the life of a royalist girl, Pauline, and escapes with her to an isolated castle. There he finds Charlotte, claiming to be a widow, with Pauline's brother Henri. A prince arrives from London to organise resistance in the Vendée and is struck by Charlotte, who was told by a gypsy that she would become a princess. She admits that she is married to Nicolas, so the prince has him drugged and carried into Nantes city hall to get a divorce. Put back on his ship for America, Nicolas’ divorce certificate blows overboard. Diving into the Loire, he swims ashore to find Charlotte again, but she has left with the prince for neutral Germany. Pursuing her across France in the throes of the Austrian invasion, he catches her at the frontier. Fifteen years later, Nicolas is made a prince by Napoleon and the gypsy's prediction comes true.

Cast
 Jean-Paul Belmondo as Nicolas Philibert
 Marlène Jobert as Charlotte
 Laura Antonelli as Pauline
 Michel Auclair as Prince
 Julien Guiomar as Representative
 Mario David as Requiem
 Charles Denner as Traveller
 Georges Beller as Simon
 Paul Crauchet as Public Prosecutor
 Marc Dudicourt as Le chauve
 Patrick Préjean as Saint-Aubin
 Sim as Lucas
 Pierre Brasseur as Gosselin
 Sami Frey as Marquis de Guérandes (as Sami Frei)

References

External links

The Married Couple of the Year Two at Le Film Guide

1971 films
1970s French-language films
Italian historical comedy films
Romanian historical comedy films
Films set in Nantes
Films shot in Romania
Films directed by Jean-Paul Rappeneau
Films set in 1793
French Revolution films
Films scored by Michel Legrand
Films with screenplays by Jean-Paul Rappeneau
1970s historical comedy films
French historical comedy films
Films about divorce
1971 comedy films
1970s French films
1970s Italian films